DXAS (1116 AM) is a radio station owned and operated by the Far East Broadcasting Company. The station's studio is located at the 3rd Floor, Phidco Bldg., Veterans Ave., Zamboanga City.

References

Catholic radio stations
Radio stations established in 1969
Radio stations in Zamboanga City
Far East Broadcasting Company
1969 establishments in the Philippines